Folliculosebaceous cystic hamartoma abbreviated as (FSCH) is a rare cutaneous hamartoma consisting of dilated folliculosebaceous units invested in mesenchymal elements. it typically affects adults, have a predilection for the central face or scalp, with less than 1.5 cm dimension. Clinically, the lesions are asymptomatic, rubbery to firm in consistency, and usually occur on or above the neck in (> 90%) of cases, Histopathologically, FSCH shares several similar features to sebaceous trichofolliculoma, but it is usually possible to differentiate these two tumors.

See also 
 Basaloid follicular hamartoma
 List of cutaneous conditions

References

Epidermal nevi, neoplasms, and cysts